Sky Office Tower is a dual business tower, elliptically shaped, located in Zagreb, Croatia, north of the Zagrebačka Avenue, near the intersection with Zagrebačka cesta. The office tower was completed in 2012. It is one of the few high-rise construction projects in Zagreb that persisted throughout the economic crisis in 2010.

The tower has 22 floors above ground and four underground floors. In 2007, the whole project was estimated to cost 76 million euros.

The tower was originally planned to have a total of 26 floors, three of them underground. After the construction started, a change of plan to 29 above-ground floors was announced. This would have made the tower 108 meters high, matching Zagreb Cathedral, the tallest building in the city.  The construction was halted for 6 months in 2009 due to funding problems caused by the ongoing global financial crisis. Eventually, the number of floors above ground was reduced to 22.

It has a total of 706 parking spaces – 659 in the garage and 47 in the outdoor space. Access to the underground garages is provided via two entry-exit ramps, which are heated against freezing. Underground levels with parking and storage areas are directly linked to the office spaces.


See also 
 List of tallest buildings in Croatia

References

Bibliography

External links

 
 

Buildings and structures in Zagreb
Skyscraper office buildings in Croatia
Trešnjevka
Commercial buildings completed in 2012
Modernist architecture in Croatia
2012 establishments in Croatia